Spartaco Morelli (15 September 1908 - December 1968) was a Swiss-born Italian marathon runner who was 7th in the 10,000 m at the 1934 European Athletics Championships.

Morelli won three national championships at individual senior level.

References

External links
 

1908 births
1968 deaths
Italian male marathon runners
Swiss emigrants to Italy